Speewa is a locality in Victoria, Australia, located approximately 19 km from Swan Hill, Victoria on the Murray River.  It is unusual in that it shares its name with a contiguous locality in New South Wales.

The Speewa Ferry connecting it is the only crossing of the Murray River between Swan Hill and Nyah.

Speewa Post Office opened on 2 August 1924. In 1964 it was renamed as a New South Wales office.

See also

 Murray River crossings
 Speewa, New South Wales

References

Towns in Victoria (Australia)
Rural City of Swan Hill
Populated places on the Murray River